EPSP may be an abbreviation for:

 5-enolpyruvylshikimate-3-phosphate  An enzyme in plants, bacteria, fungi, and some protists
 Excitatory postsynaptic potential  A characteristic of neurons